Schinkia is a genus of Gram-positive rod-shaped bacteria in the family Bacillaceae from the order Bacillales. The type species of this genus is Schinkia azotoformans.

Members of Schinkia are previously species belonging to Bacillus, a genus that has been recognized as displaying extensive polyphyly and phylogenetic heterogeneity due to the vague criteria (such as the ability to form endospores in the presence of oxygen) previously used to assign species to this clade. Multiple studies using comparative phylogenetic analyses have been published in an attempt to clarify the evolutionary relationships between Bacillus species, resulting in the establishment of numerous novel genera such as Alkalihalobacillus, Brevibacillus, Solibacillus, Alicyclobacillus, Virgibacillus, and Evansella. In addition, the genus Bacillus has been restricted to only include species closely related to Bacillus subtilis and Bacillus cereus.

The name Schinkia was named after German microbiologist Professor Bernard Schink, University of Konstanz, for his studies of diverse microorganisms and his contributions in the discipline of microbial taxonomy.

Biochemical characteristics and molecular signatures 
Members of this genus are aerobic or facultatively anaerobic and found in soil. All members can produce endospores and are motile by means of peritrichous flagella. Schinkia can grow in temperatures ranging from 20°C to 46°C but the optimal growth temperature is in the range of 30-40°C. Members of this genus are industrially significant as Schinkia azotoformans is able to produce nitrogen by co-denitrification, and Schinkia oryziterrae is a selenium nanoparticle-producing and nitrate-reducing bacterium.

These conserved signature indels were identified through analyses of genome sequences from Schinkia species and can be used to reliably demarcate this genus from other Bacillaceae genera and bacteria in molecular terms.

Taxonomy 
Schinkia, as of May 2021, contains a total of 2 species with validly published names. This genus was identified as a monophyletic clade and phylogenetically unrelated to other Bacillus species in studies examining the taxonomic relationships within Bacillus. This branching pattern is also observed in the Genome Taxonomy Database (GTDB).

References 

Bacteria genera
Bacillaceae